The 1948–49 BAA season was the Bullets' 2nd season in the NBA/BAA.

Draft picks

Roster

Regular season

Season standings

Record vs. opponents

Game log

Playoffs

East Division Semifinals 
(2) New York Knicks vs. (3) Baltimore Bullets: Knicks win series 2-1
Game 1 @ New York: Baltimore 82, New York 81
Game 2 @ Baltimore: New York 84, Baltimore 74
Game 3 @ New York: New York 103, Baltimore 99 (OT)

Last Playoff Meeting: 1948 BAA Quarterfinals (Baltimore won 2-1)

Player statistics

References

Baltimore Bullets (1944–1954) seasons
Baltimore